The Zagreb–Belgrade railway was the Yugoslav Railways  long railway line connecting the cities of Zagreb and Belgrade in SR Croatia and SR Serbia, at the time of Yugoslavia.

It was the route of the Orient Express service from 1919 to 1977.

Electrification was finished in 1970. It was the first fully electrified line in Croatia with 25 kV 50 AC system (Zagreb-Rijeka was electrified earlier, but with older 3 kV DC system).

Since the breakup of Yugoslavia, it was split into the Zagreb-Tovarnik railway and the Belgrade–Šid railway, operated by Croatian Railways and Serbian Railways, respectively.

See also
Ljubljana-Zagreb railway
Pan-European Corridor X

References

External links

Railway lines in Yugoslavia